This article is about Portsmouth Football Club when they were league champions of 1949–50. They have not been champions of England since 1950. The club retained the title they won in 1948–49, beating Aston Villa 5–1 on the last day of the season, and are thus one of only five English teams to have won back-to-back titles since World War II.

First Division

FA Cup

1949 FA Charity Shield

Players Used 

Portsmouth F.C. seasons
Portsmouth
English football championship-winning seasons